Võ Ngọc Toàn (born 20 October 1994) is a Vietnamese footballer who plays as a midfielder for V.League 1 club SHB Đà Nẵng.

References 

1994 births
Living people
Vietnamese footballers
Association football midfielders
V.League 1 players
Song Lam Nghe An FC players
SHB Da Nang FC players